AS Monaco won the 1977–78 Division 1 season of the French Association Football League with 53 points.

Participating teams

 SEC Bastia
 Bordeaux
 Stade Lavallois
 RC Lens
 Olympique Lyonnais
 Olympique de Marseille
 FC Metz
 AS Monaco
 AS Nancy
 FC Nantes Atlantique
 OGC Nice
 Nîmes Olympique
 Paris Saint-Germain FC
 Stade de Reims
 FC Rouen
 AS Saint-Etienne
 FC Sochaux
 RC Strasbourg
 Troyes AF
 US Valenciennes-Anzin

League table

Promoted from Division 2, who will play in Division 1 season 1978/1979
 Lille: Champion of Division 2, winner of Division 2 group B
 Angers SCO: Runner-up, winner of Division 2 group A
 Paris FC: Third place, winner of barrages against RC Lens

Results

Top goalscorers

References

 Division 1 season 1977-1978 at pari-et-gagne.com

Ligue 1 seasons
French
1